Merchweiler is a municipality in the district of Neunkirchen, in Saarland, Germany. It is situated approximately 10 km west of Neunkirchen, and 15 km northeast of Saarbrücken. The municipality of Merchweiler consists of two parts: Merchweiler (village) and Wemmetsweiler (village).

Twin towns — sister cities
Merchweiler is twinned with:

  Falicon, France (1987)

References

Neunkirchen (German district)